Australia Walkabout Wildlife Park is a wildlife sanctuary located in Calga, New South Wales, Australia. The wildlife park is home to Australian native birds, mammals and reptiles as well as farm animals. It offers research and education programs, with visitors able to undertake day and night tours. The park is home to a wide range of Australian animals and in 2021 became home to a group of meerkats, the park's first exotic animals.

Animals found at the park
Native bird species include

Emu
Australian boobook owl
Tawny frogmouth
Laughing kookaburra
Major Mitchell's cockatoo
Sulphur-crested cockatoo
Galah
Eclectus parrot
Rainbow lorikeet
Pacific black duck
Australian wood duck
Satin bowerbird
White-headed pigeon
  

Non-native bird species include

Blue peafowl (in petting zoo)
Domestic goose (in petting zoo)
Domestic turkey (in petting zoo)
Brahma chicken (in petting zoo)

Native herptile (reptile and amphibian) species include
 
Lace tree goanna
Eastern water dragon
Pygmy bearded dragon
Shingleback lizard
Eastern blue-tongued lizard
Cunningham's spiny-tailed skink
Hosmer's spiny-tailed skink
Barking gecko
Olive python
Murray Darling carpet python
Centralian carpet python
Coastal carpet python
Jungle carpet python
Diamond python
Spotted python
Tiger snake
Red-bellied black snake
Common death adder
Brown tree snake
Eastern long-necked turtle
Eastern short-necked turtle
Eastern dwarf tree frog
Peron's tree frog
Eastern froglet
Red-crowned toadlet
 

Native mammal species include

Grey-headed flying-fox
Dingo
Short-beaked echidna
Tasmanian devil
Spotted-tail quoll
Eastern quoll
Bare-nosed wombat
Southern hairy-nosed wombat
Koala
Red kangaroo
Eastern grey kangaroo
Eastern hill wallaroo
Tammar wallaby
Parma wallaby
Red-necked wallaby
Swamp wallaby
Agile Wallaby
Red-necked pademelon
Rufous bettong
Long-nosed potoroo
Southeastern common brushtail possum
Southeastern common ringtail possum
Sugar glider
Bilby
Long-nosed bandicoot
Spinifex hopping mouse
 

Non-native mammal species include

Meerkat
Huacaya alpaca (in petting zoo)
Domestic pig (in petting zoo)
Domestic miniature goat (in petting zoo)
Domestic rabbit (in petting zoo)
Guinea pig (in petting zoo)

References

External links

Zoos in New South Wales
Wildlife parks in Australia
Central Coast (New South Wales)
Zoos established in 2001
2001 establishments in Australia